The Anglican Diocese of Omu-Aran is one of eight within the Anglican Province of Kwara, itself one of 14 provinces within the Church of Nigeria.

The diocese was established in 2007, and the pioneer bishop was Philip Adeyemo. On Adeyemo's retirement in 2019, he was succeeded by Festus Oyetola Sobanke.

Notes

Church of Nigeria dioceses
Dioceses of the Province of Kwara